Reyhanluy, also rendered as Reyhanlu may refer to:
 Reyhanluy-e Olya
 Reyhanluy-e Sofla
 Reyhanluy-e Vosta